Javeria Abbasi is a Pakistani film–television actress, model and host. She has appeared in the Hum TV serials Dil, Diya, Dehleez (in which she plays a lead role) and Thori Si Khushiyan as well as Doraha, Andata, Sotayli, Tere Liye; the ARY Digital serials "Darmiyan" Phool Wali Gali and Phir Kho Jayye Na and PTV serials Maamta, Kash Mein Teri Beti Na Hoti and Chahatain. More recently, she made her film debut in the 2011 Pakistani film, Saltanat. She also worked with the singer and actor Ali Haider in PTV Long Play Pyar Agar Kabhi Phir Hua.

Personal life 
Javeria was married to actor Shamoon Abbasi in 1997, they then divorced in 2010. She has one daughter, actress Anzela Abbasi.

Awards and nominations

Television

References

External links 
 

Living people
Pakistani female models
Pakistani television actresses
Pakistani film actresses
21st-century Pakistani actresses
Actresses from Karachi
Actresses from Lahore
Year of birth missing (living people)
Actresses in Urdu cinema